Harry Edison Swings Buck Clayton, subtitled (And Vice Versa), is an album by trumpeters Harry Edison, and Buck Clayton which was recorded in 1958 and released on the Verve label.

Track listing 
All compositions by Harry Edison except where noted.
 "Memories for the Count" – 8:51
 "Come With Me" – 5:51
 "Critic's Delight" – 6:48
 "Oh How I Hate to Get Up in the Morning" – 9:06
 "Medley: It All Depends On You/Charmaine/How Long Has This Been Going On?/Makin' Whoopee" (Ray Henderson, Buddy DeSylva, Lew Brown/Ernö Rapée, Lew Pollack/George Gershwin, Ira Gershwin/Walter Donaldson, Gus Kahn) – 8:54

Personnel 
Harry Edison, Buck Clayton – trumpet
Jimmy Forrest – tenor saxophone
Eddie Costa – vibraphone
Jimmy Jones – piano
Freddie Green – guitar
Joe Benjamin – bass
Charlie Persip – drums

References 

1958 albums
Buck Clayton albums
Harry Edison albums
Verve Records albums